Appalachian Mountain Club (AMC) is the oldest outdoor group in the United States. Created in 1876 to explore and preserve the White Mountains in New Hampshire, it has expanded throughout the northeastern U.S., with 12 chapters stretching from Maine to Washington, D.C. The AMC's 275,000 members, advocates, and supporters mix outdoor recreation, particularly hiking and backpacking, with environmental activism. Additional activities include cross-country skiing, whitewater and flatwater canoeing and kayaking, sea kayaking, sailing, rock climbing and bicycle riding.  The Club has about 2,700 volunteers, who lead roughly 7,000 trips and activities per year. The organization publishes a number of books, guides, and trail maps.

History

Appalachian Mountain Club was organized in 1876, incorporated in 1878, and authorized by legislative act of 1894 to hold mountain and forest lands as historic sites. The club was formed by the efforts of Massachusetts Institute of Technology Professor Edward Charles Pickering and Samuel Hubbard Scudder, who invited fellow Boston academics and vacationers to form a group interested in mountain exploration. The club aims to preserve the beauty of mountain forests, waters, historic sites and resorts; to render them attractive to visitors and excursionists; to publish accurate maps thereof; and to collect scientific data concerning the mountains. The group helped map the White Mountains and in 1888 built the first of eight High Huts in the range, modeled on Alpine shelters.

In 2003, Appalachian Mountain Club purchased  of land east of Moosehead Lake and southwest of Baxter State Park, along the 100-Mile Wilderness portion of the Appalachian Trail, as part of their Maine Woods Initiative.  It has converted the Katahdin Iron Works portion of the purchase to a nature preserve, logged a portion, and runs a sporting camp called Little Lyford Pond camps about two miles (3 km) off the trail.  The Club purchased an adjacent , including Baker Mountain, in 2015, and is considering purchasing more sporting camps in the vicinity.

In 2011, the Appalachian Mountain Club opened the newly built Gorman Chairback Lodge.

In September 2016, the Appalachian Mountain Club sold their Joy Street headquarters to a group of real estate investors for $15 million, who planned to turn the 22,000 square feet of office space on Beacon Hill into residential units. In December 2016, The Appalachian Mountain Club purchased Roughan Hall in the Charlestown neighborhood of Boston, and moved their headquarters there in September 2017.

Organization 
Appalachian Mountain Club's headquarters is located in Roughan Hall at 10 City Square in the Charlestown neighborhood of Boston, with an adjunct facility at 6 Spice St.

Appalachian Mountain Club employed 807 individuals in 2017. AMC estimated that 16,000 individuals volunteered for the organization in 2017.

In 2017, the Appalachian Mountain Club earned over $15.2 million from its outdoor program centers, educational activities, membership dues, trail activities, and advertising. Sale of products netted over $780,000, rental income netted over $240,000, investment income was over $2.8 million, and charitable contributions received were almost $14.0 million.

Appalachian Mountain Club has twelve chapters located in Connecticut, Maine, Massachusetts, New Hampshire, New York, New Jersey, Pennsylvania, Rhode Island, and Washington, D.C. The largest chapter is the Boston chapter, with over 20,000 members, followed by the New Hampshire chapter with over 12,000 members, and the New York-North Jersey chapter with over 10,000 members.

Activities

The High Huts 

Appalachian Mountain Club owns and maintains a series of eight mountain huts in the White Mountains. Modeled after similar shelters in the Alps, the various huts hold between 36 and 90 people. Hikers may reserve bunks; at most huts dinner and breakfast are included.

The huts' 30-year special use permits were renewed by the U.S. Forest Service in 1999 following a four-year process that included an environmental impact statement.

Campsites and Shelters 
The Appalachian Mountain Club also operates many campsites and shelters in the White Mountains, the Mahoosucs, and other New England locations. These campsites are often run by caretakers who manage waste, fees, and nearby trails. Nine of the highest use campsites have a $15 per person fee: Kinsman Pond, Liberty Spring, Garfield Ridge, 13 Falls, Guyot, Ethan Pond, Nauman, Imp, and Speck Pond.

Activities 
The majority of the AMC's activities are conducted by its members who volunteer to lead trips throughout the northeast, from Maine to DC.  Activities include hiking, backpacking, paddling, biking, rock climbing, camping, skiing, and snowshoeing, ranging in duration from a day to a week.  Additional long-duration domestic and international trips are conducted through the AMC's Adventure Travel program.

Trails 
The club also operates several trails operations. The Volunteer for Trails program brings teens and adults on day to week long programs teaching trail building and maintenance techniques based out of Camp Dodge in Pinkham Notch. The Roving Conservation Crew is a small crew which works on both backcountry and frontcountry projects around New England. The White Mountain Professional Trail Crew focuses on trail projects within the White Mountains, and the Maine Woods Professional Crew focuses on projects in Maine.

The Four Thousand Footer Club 
A committee of Appalachian Mountain Club administers the Four Thousand Footer Club.  Anyone who has climbed to and from each of the 48 New Hampshire Four-thousand footers is eligible to apply for membership to the club.  Members are given a patch and new inductees are invited to attend a yearly celebration dinner.  The Four Thousand Footer Club also recognizes individuals who complete the New England Four Thousand Footers (of which there are 67) and the New England Hundred Highest.

Publications 
Appalachia, the club journal, has been published since 1894. Books relating to subjects such as mountaineering and touring trips are published under the auspices of the society.

National Register of Historic Places
The Club's Ponkapoag Camp is listed on the National Register of Historic Places.

See also 
Appalachian Trail Conservancy
Little Lyford
Three Mile Island (Lake Winnipesaukee)
Crawford Notch
Pinkham Notch
Mount Cardigan

References

External links 
 
 A map of the hut system from south to north

 
501(c)(3) organizations
Appalachian Trail
Charities based in Massachusetts
Climbing organizations
Environmental charities
Hiking organizations in the United States
Sports organizations established in 1876
1876 establishments in the United States